Taohuahu Park is a metro station of Line 3 of the Hangzhou Metro in China. It is located in Shangcheng District of Hangzhou. The station was opened on 21 February 2022.

Gallery

References 

Railway stations in Zhejiang
Railway stations in China opened in 2022
Hangzhou Metro stations